Anderson Lake is a lake in South Dakota, in the United States. It is located less than 1 mile (1 km) east of Bitter Lake, with its closest urban population center being located in Waubay, approximately 4 mi (6.5 km) northwest of the lake.

Anderson Lake has the name of Soren Anderson, who owned a farm near it.

See also
List of lakes in South Dakota

References

Lakes of South Dakota
Lakes of Day County, South Dakota